Cebuano may refer to:
 Cebuano people, of Cebu, Philippines
 Cebuano language, their Austronesian language

See also
 Cebu (disambiguation)
 Cebuano literature
 Cebuano theater
 Cebuano Wikipedia

Language and nationality disambiguation pages